The Rajya Sabha (meaning the "Council of States") is the upper house of the Parliament of India. Maharashtra elects 19 seats and they are indirectly elected by the state legislators of Maharashtra. Earlier since 1952, Bombay State elects 17 seats, Madhya Pradesh State elects 12 seats, Hyderabad State 11 seats and Mysore State elect 6 seats. After Constitution (Seventh Amendment) Act of 1956, Bombay State elects 27 seats. After Bombay Reorganisation Act of 1960, three seats were increased and effective from 1 May 1960, while new Maharashtra State elects 19 seats, the new Gujarat State elects 11 seats. The number of seats allocated to the party, are determined by the number of seats a party possesses during nomination and the party nominates a member to be voted on. Elections within the state legislatures are held using Single transferable vote with proportional representation.

Current members

Keys:

BJP MP list

Shiv Sena MP list

NCP MP list

INC MP list

JP/JD MP list

SCF/PWP/RPI MP list

CPI/SBP MP list

Others/IND MP list 

 Star (*) Represents current Rajya Sabha members from MH

References

External links

Rajya Sabha homepage hosted by the Indian government
Rajya Sabha FAQ page hosted by the Indian government
Nominated members list
State wise list

Maharashtra
 
Lists of people from Maharashtra